Allan Davis may refer to:

 Allan Davis (cyclist) (born 1980), Australian cyclist
 Allan Davis (director) (1913–2001), Anglo-Australian actor, director and producer
 Allan Davis (footballer) (born 1948), Australian rules footballer

See also
Allen Davis (disambiguation)
Alan Davis (disambiguation)